Zuccotti is a surname. Notable people with the surname include:

 John Eugene Zuccotti (1937–2015), Italian-American businessman
 Zuccotti Park, New York City park
 Susan Zuccotti (born 1940), American historian, wife of John

Italian-language surnames